Mian Hamza Hayaud Din (born 11 July 1989) is a Pakistani international rugby player who plays for the Islamabad Jinns RFC in the Servis Super League. Hayauddin has represented the Pakistani national team in rugby union as well as rugby sevens. He is the grandson of former Pakistani general Mian Hayaud Din and son of senior Pakistani civil servant Mian Asad Hayauddin.

Biography 

Hayauddin attended Bard College where he began playing rugby for Bard College RFC in his junior year (2010). After playing for the Kingston Mad Dogs RFC, Chicago Blaze RFC, and DePaul University RFC between 2011, 2012, and 2013 respectively, he returned to Pakistan in order to qualify for the Pakistan rugby union team. Most recently, he represented Pakistan rugby sevens at the 2014 Asian Games in Incheon, South Korea.

Rugby 

Hayauddin is known for his dangerous sidestep which his teammates refer to as "happy feet" and his cover defence. He plays fullback and scrumhalf. His premier tournament debut occurred at the 2014 Asian Games against Hong Kong.

External links 
Player Profile
Town & Country Spread

References

1989 births
Living people
Asian Games competitors for Pakistan
Pakistan international rugby union players
Pakistani rugby union players
Rugby union players at the 2014 Asian Games
Rugby union fullbacks
Rugby union scrum-halves